Steppin' Out With a Dream is an album by American jazz pianist Ahmad Jamal recorded in 1976 and released on the 20th Century label.

Track listing 
All compositions by Ahmad Jamal unless noted.

Side one
 "Handicapper" – 7:37
 "Prelude to a Kiss" (Irving Gordon, Irving Mills, Duke Ellington) – 7:50
 "My One and Only Love" (Robert Mellin, Guy Wood) – 8:48

Side two
 "Tucson" – 9:10
 "Crossfire" – 9:56

Personnel 
Ahmad Jamal – piano, electric piano
Calvin Keys – guitar
John Heard (listed on LP as "Hurd") – bass 
Frank Gant – drums
Selden Newton – percussion instruments
Neil Brody – engineer
Michael Paladin – album photography
Jamico – album art direction
Michael Levy – album cover and liner design
Trici Venola – illustration

References 

20th Century Fox Records albums
Ahmad Jamal albums
1976 albums